Nicholas or Nick Harvey may refer to:

Nick Harvey (born 1961), British politician, MP for North Devon
Nick Harvey (cricketer) (born 1973), English cricketer
Nicholas Harvey (MP for Huntingdonshire) (died 1532), English member of parliament

See also
 Nicholas Hervey (1961–1998), British peer and politician, son of the 6th Marquess of Bristol